The cuisine of Brisbane derives from mainstream Australian cuisine, as well as many cuisines of international origin, with major influences from Asian cuisine, European cuisine and American cuisine that reflect the city's ethnic diversity, though Brisbane is represented by a wide range of other ethnic cuisines.

Brisbane's culinary scene is often described as more casual with an emphasis on outdoor dining. Café culture is prominent with Australian-style brunch particularly common. Roof-top bars are also an iconic establishment of the city and as well as its Street food scene with Food trucks and pop-up bars common.

Brisbane is home to over 6,000 restaurants and dining establishments, with outdoor dining featuring prominently. Moreton Bay bugs, less commonly known as flathead lobsters, are an ingredient named for the Brisbane region and which feature commonly in the city's cuisine.

Suburbs/areas with cuisine culture 

 South Brisbane – American, Japanese, Italian
 West End – Greek, Italian, Chinese, Vietnamese
 Fortitude Valley – Chinese, Korean, Japanese, American
 Petrie Terrace – Caxton Street Precinct, Seafood
 New Farm, Queensland – Italian (also known as "Little Italy")
 Sunnybank – Chinese, Korean, Japanese, Vietnamese
 Sunnybank Hills – Chinese, Korean, Japanese, Vietnamese
 Teneriffe – Italian
 Bowen Hills – King Street: Mixed cuisine, French
 Newstead – Gasworks precinct, Modern Australian
 Woolloongabba – Russian
 Hamilton – Modern Australian (Racecourse Road, Eat Street Northshore)
 Moorooka – African (also known as "Little Africa")
 Paddington – Mixed, café culture
 Manly – Seafood
 Sandgate – Seafood
 Inala – Vietnamese

Foods native to Brisbane 

 Macadamia
 Lemon Scented Myrtle
 Australian Finger Lime
 Bunya Nut
 Cinnamon Myrtle
 Davidson's Plum
 Riberry
 Small-Leaved Tamarind
 Midgen Berry
 Moreton Bay Bug
 Moreton Bay Rock Oyster

Breweries 

 Felons Brewing Co.
 Slipstream Brewing Co.
 Range Brewing
 Stone & Wood Brewing Co.
 Brisbane Brewing Co.
 Sea Legs Brewing
 Soapbox Brewing
 Helios Brewing
 Catchment Brewing Co.
 Newstead Brewing Co.
 Ballistic Beer Co.
 Aether Brewing
 All Inn Brewing
 Revel Brewing Co.
 Green Beacon Brewing Co.
 Thirsty Chiefs Brewing Company

Food festivals in Brisbane 

 Paniyiri Greek Festival
 Caxton Street Seafood and Wine Festival
 Le Festival
 Fish Lane Festival
 Indie Spirits Tasting
 Sweet As Dessert Festival
 Briz Chilli Festival
 Brisbane BBQ Festival
 Scenic Rim Eat Local Week
 Teneriffe Festival
 Regional Flavours
 Brisbane Times Night Noodle Markets
 Ekka
 Effervescence Champagne Festival
 Moreton Bay Food & Wine Festival
 Scandinavian Festival
 Oktoberfest Brisbane
 Good Food & Wine Show
 Straddie Oyster Festival
 Brisbane Ice Cream Festival

See also

 Australian cuisine
 Modern Australian cuisine
 Culture of Brisbane

References 

Australian cuisine
Culture of Brisbane
Cuisine of Brisbane